Where I'm From (Original French title: D'où je viens) is a 2014 National Film Board of Canada documentary by , exploring his childhood in the working class city of Verdun, Quebec and contrasting his experiences with life today in Verdun, now a multi-cultural borough of Montreal.

Where I'm From focuses on two neighbourhood boys who serve as stand-ins for Demers as a child, as well as a variety of local characters. The film explores the changing face of Verdun as well as the filmmaker's anger and unhappiness as a child, due in part to his being adopted. The film also explores the powerful role that the Saint Lawrence River, which borders Verdun, has played in his own imaginative life growing up, as well as the lives of the children in his film.

Demers has stated that it also represented a creative risk to make a documentary film not based on interviews, as he had previously done, but rather a personal film that attempts to see life through the eyes of child.

Demers, who now lives in Mile End, Montreal, rented an apartment in his old neighbourhood for three months to regain a feel for the neighbourhood as he planned his shoot. During that process, five key themes emerged that became central to the film, according to the director: "Childhood. The relationship with nature. Faith. The words. And struggle. That was my guideline."

Trilogy
The film completed a trilogy of documentary works by Demers—previously a fiction filmmaker— that he was inspired to make after finally meeting his biological mother. She has told him that his biological father was Italian, which inspired a film about traditional Montreal barbers, many of whom were from Italy, entitled Barbiers – Une histoire d'hommes. Demers' follow up film, Les dames en bleu, was  about Quebec singer Michel Louvain and his legion of mostly female fans from his mother's generation.

Release
The film had its world premiere at International Film Festival Rotterdam, followed by the Canadian documentary film festivals RIDM and Hot Docs. It had its theatrical premiere at Excentris in Montreal and Cinema Le Clap in Quebec City on December 26, 2014.

The film received a Canadian Screen Award nomination for Best Cinematography in a Documentary at the 3rd Canadian Screen Awards.

References

External links

Where I'm From at Excentris website
Where I'm From at Hot Docs

Documentary films about Montreal
Autobiographical documentary films
National Film Board of Canada documentaries
Quebec films
Verdun, Quebec
2014 films
2014 documentary films
Documentary films about children
Documentary films about adoption
2010s French-language films
2010s Canadian films